Wang Zhengming (born 16 February 1990) is a Chinese badminton player from Guangzhou, Guangdong. He was the boys' singles gold medalists at the 2008 Asian and World Junior Championships.

Career

2010 
A World and Asian Junior Champion two years earlier, 2010 was Wang's breakthrough year on the international badminton scene. His most impressive achievements were finishing runner-up to his idol Lin Dan in the Asian Championships and reaching the semi-finals of the China Masters BWF Superseries event. By the end of the year, Wang's ranking had risen over 200 places to 43rd.

2011 
Wang reached the quarter-finals of the first Superseries Premier event, the Korea Open, registering an impressive 21–11, 21–14 victory over reigning World Champion Chen Jin along the way. Wang also reached the semi-finals of the Singapore Open beating former Olympic and two-time Asian games winner Taufik Hidayat.

2013 
In March, Wang won his first senior international title, the Swiss Open, beating compatriot Du Pengyu in the final 21–18 21–18. Wang lost in the third round of the 2013 BWF World Championships in August from first seed Malaysian Lee Chong Wei. In September, at his home China in the city of Changzhou, Wang won his first Superseries event, the China Masters, beating the Dane Jan Ø. Jørgensen 21–13, 16–21, 23–21 in a grueling semi-final match and then Korean qualifier Son Wan-ho in another close 3 games final 11–22, 21–14, 24–22. Again at his home country in October, he lost the final of the East Asian Games in Tianjin from compatriot Du Pengyu. In November, Wang also reached the final of his first Superseries Premier event, the China Open in Shanghai, along the way beating fifth seed Tommy Sugiarto from Indonesia 21–15, 14–21, 21–18 in the 3rd round, compatriot and 3rd seed Du Pengyu 21–17, 21–8 in the quarterfinals, Japanese talent Kento Momota 22–20, 9–21, 21–6 in the semi-final and ultimately losing to compatriot Chen Long in a 3 games final 21–19, 8–21, 14–21.

2014 
In July of the year 2014, Wang lost the final of the Chinese Taipei Open from compatriot Lin Dan: 19–21, 14–21.

After beating Kento Momota of Japan in the semi-finals of the French Open, Wang lost to Chou Tien-chen in the finals 21–10, 23–25, 19–21.

2015 
In April 2014, Wang wins the China Masters in Changzhou beating compatriot Huang Yuxiang 22–20, 21–19 in the finals.

2016 
On 9 September 2016, Gong Weijie, a former Chinese national player, revealed that Wang has retired from the national team.

Achievements

Asian Championships 
Men's singles

East Asian Games 
Men's singles

BWF World Junior Championships 
Boys' singles

Asian Junior Championships 
Boys' singles

BWF Superseries 
The BWF Superseries, which was launched on 14 December 2006 and implemented in 2007, was a series of elite badminton tournaments, sanctioned by the Badminton World Federation (BWF). BWF Superseries levels were Superseries and Superseries Premier. A season of Superseries consisted of twelve tournaments around the world that had been introduced since 2011. Successful players were invited to the Superseries Finals, which were held at the end of each year.

Men's singles

  BWF Superseries Finals tournament
  BWF Superseries Premier tournament
  BWF Superseries tournament

BWF Grand Prix 
The BWF Grand Prix had two levels, the Grand Prix and Grand Prix Gold. It was a series of badminton tournaments sanctioned by the Badminton World Federation (BWF) and played between 2007 and 2017.

Men's singles

  BWF Grand Prix Gold tournament
  BWF Grand Prix tournament

References

External links 

1990 births
Living people
Badminton players from Guangzhou
Chinese male badminton players